Stopper may refer to:

 Bung, a plug used to stop the opening of a container
 Laboratory rubber stopper, a specific type of bung
 Plug (sanitation), used to stop a drainage outlet
 Defender (association football), in soccer (association football)
 Milkor 37/38mm and 40mm Stopper, a gun
 Alternative name for a whitewater hole, in whitewater kayaking
 Stopper, in the game of bridge
 Stopper, in baseball, a key starting or relief pitcher
 Slang for stopwatch, a handheld timepiece designed to measure the amount of time
 Stopper knot, a type of a knot at the end of the rope
 Stopper, a common name for some plant species in the genus Eugenia

See also

 
 
 Stop (disambiguation)